Programmed Data Processor (PDP), referred to by some customers, media and authors as "Programmable Data Processor," is a term used by the Digital Equipment Corporation from 1957 to 1990 for several lines of minicomputers.

The name 'PDP' intentionally avoids the use of the term 'computer'. At the time of the first PDPs, computers had a reputation of being large, complicated, and expensive machines. The venture capitalists behind Digital (especially Georges Doriot) would not support Digital's attempting to build a 'computer' and the term 'minicomputer' had not yet been coined. So instead, Digital used their existing line of logic modules to build a Programmed Data Processor and aimed it at a market that could not afford the larger computers.

The various PDP machines can generally be grouped into families based on word length.

Series
Members of the PDP series include:

PDP-1 The original PDP, an 18-bit 4-rack machine used in early time-sharing operating system work, and prominent in MIT's early hacker culture, which led to the (Massachusetts) Route 128 hardware startup belt (DEC's second home, Prime Computer, etc.).  What is believed to be the first video game, Spacewar!, was developed for this machine, along with the first known word processing program for a general-purpose computer, "Expensive Typewriter".

The last of DEC's 53 PDP-1 computers was built in 1969, a decade after the first, and nearly all of them were still in use as of 1975. "An average configuration cost $120,000" at a time "when most computer systems sold for a million dollars or more."

Its architectural successors as 18-bit machines were the PDP-4, PDP-7, PDP-9, and the PDP-15.

PDP-2 A number reserved for an unbuilt, undesigned 24-bit design.
PDP-3 First DEC-designed (for US "black budget" outfits) 36-bit machine, though DEC did not offer it as a product. The only PDP-3 was built by the CIA's Scientific Engineering Institute (SEI) in Waltham, Massachusetts to process radar cross section data for the Lockheed A-12 reconnaissance aircraft in 1960.  Architecturally it was essentially a PDP-1 controlling a PDP-1 stretched to 36-bit word width.
PDP-4 This 18-bit machine, first shipped in 1962 of which "approximately 54 were sold" was a compromise: "with slower memory and different packaging" than the PDP-1, but priced at $65,000 - considerably less than its predecessor (about half the price).  All later 18-bit PDP machines (7, 9 and 15) are based on a similar, but enlarged instruction set, more powerful, but based on the same concepts as the 12-bit PDP-5/PDP-8 series. One customer of these early PDP machines was Atomic Energy of Canada. The installation at Chalk River, Ontario included an early PDP-4 with a display system and a new PDP-5 as interface to the research reactor instrumentation and control.
PDP-5 It was the world's first commercially produced minicomputer and DEC's first 12-bit machine (1963).  The instruction set was later expanded in the PDP-8 to handle more bit rotations and to increase the maximum memory size from 4K words to 32K words. It was one of the first computer series with more than 1,000 built.
PDP-6 This 36-bit machine, DEC's first large PDP computer, came in 1964 with the first DEC-supported timesharing system. 23 were installed. Although the PDP-6 was "disappointing to management," it introduced the instruction set and was the prototype for the far more successful PDP-10 and DEC System-20, of which hundreds were sold.
PDP-7 Replacement for the PDP-4; DEC's first wire-wrapped machine.  It was introduced in 1964, and a second version, the 7A, was subsequently added. A total of 120 7 & 7A systems were sold.

The first version of Unix, and the first version of B, a predecessor of C, were written for the PDP-7 at Bell Labs, as was the first version (by DEC) of MUMPS.
PDP-8 12-bit machine (1965) with a tiny instruction set; DEC's first major commercial success and the start of the minicomputer revolution. Many were purchased (at discount prices, a DEC tradition, which also included free manuals for anyone who asked during the Ken Olsen years) by schools, university departments, and research laboratories.

Over 50,000 units among various models of the family (A, E, F, I, S, L, M) were sold. Later models are also used in the DECmate word processor and the VT-78 workstation. 
LINC-8 A hybrid of the LINC and PDP-8 computers; two instruction sets; 1966. Progenitor of the PDP-12.
PDP-9 Successor to the PDP-7; DEC's first micro-programmed machine (1966). It features a speed increase of approximately twice that of the PDP-7. The PDP-9 is also one of the first small or medium scale computers to have a keyboard monitor system based on DIGITAL's own small magnetic tape units (DECtape).  The PDP-9 established minicomputers as the leading edge of the computer industry.
PDP-10 Also marketed as the DECsystem-10, this 36-bit timesharing machine (1966) was quite successful over several different implementations (KA, KI, KL, KS) and models.  The instruction set is a slightly elaborated form of that of the PDP-6.

The KL was also used for the DECSYSTEM-20. The KS was used for the 2020, DEC's entry in the distributed processing market, introduced as "the world's lowest cost mainframe computer system."
PDP-11 The archetypal minicomputer (1970); a 16-bit machine and another commercial success for DEC. The LSI-11 is a four-chip PDP-11 used primarily for embedded systems. The 32-bit VAX series is descended from the PDP-11, and early VAX models have a PDP-11 compatibility mode. The 16-bit PDP-11 instruction set has been very influential, with processors ranging from the Motorola 68000 to the Renesas H8 and Texas Instruments MSP430, inspired by its highly orthogonal, general-register oriented instruction set and rich addressing modes. The PDP-11 family was extremely long-lived, spanning 20 years and many different implementations and technologies.
PDP-12 12-bit machine (1969), descendant of the LINC-8 and thus of the PDP-8.  It can execute the instruction set of either system.  See LINC and PDP-12 User Manual. With slight redesign, and different livery, officially followed by, and marketed as, the "Lab-8".

PDP-13 Designation was not used.
PDP-14 A machine with 12-bit instructions, intended as an industrial controller (PLC; 1969). It has no data memory or data registers; instructions can test Boolean input signals, set or clear Boolean output signals, jump conditional or unconditionally, or call a subroutine. Later versions (for example, the PDP-14/30) are based on PDP-8 physical packaging technology. I/O is line voltage.
PDP-15 DEC's final 18-bit machine (1970).  It is the only 18-bit machine constructed from TTL integrated circuits rather than discrete transistors, and, like every DEC 18-bit system (except mandatory on the PDP-1, absent on the PDP-4) has an optional integrated vector graphics terminal, DEC's first improvement on its early-designed 34n where n equalled the PDP's number. Later versions of the PDP-15 run a real-time multi-user OS called "XVM". The final model, the PDP-15/76 uses a small PDP-11 to allow Unichannel peripherals to be used.
PDP-16 A "roll-your-own" sort of computer using Register Transfer Modules, mainly intended for industrial control systems with more capability than the PDP-14.  The PDP-16/M was introduced in 1972 as a standard version of the PDP-16.

Related computers
 TX-0 designed by MIT's Lincoln Laboratory, important as influence for DEC products including Ben Gurley's design for the PDP-1
 LINC (Laboratory Instrument Computer), originally designed by MIT's Lincoln Laboratory, some built by DEC. Not in the PDP family, but important as progenitor of the PDP-12. The LINC and the PDP-8 can be considered the first minicomputers, and perhaps the first personal computers as well. The PDP-8 and PDP-11 are the most popular of the PDP series of machines. Digital never made a PDP-20, although the term was sometimes used for a PDP-10 running TOPS-20 (officially known as a DECSYSTEM-20).
 Several unlicensed clones of the PDP-11.
 TOAD-1 and TOAD-2, Foonly, and Systems Concepts PDP-10/DECSYSTEM-20-compatible machines.

Notes

References

 C. Gordon Bell, J. Craig Mudge, John E. McNamara, Computer 	Engineering: A DEC View of Hardware Systems Design (Digital, 1978)
 
 Bell, C.G., Grason, J., and Newell, A., Designing Computers and Digital Systems. Digital Press, Maynard, Mass., 1972.
 Conversations with David M. Razler (dmrazler@razler.net), owner/restorer of PDP-7s,8s,9s and 15s until the cost of hauling around 2 tons of DEC gear led him to sell off or give away everything he owned.

External links

 Mark Crispin's 1986 list of PDP's
 Several PDP and LAB's, still runnable in a German computer museum
 DEC's PDP-6 was the world's first commercial time-sharing system  Gordon Bell interview at the Smithsonian
 DEC PRODUCT TIMELINE
 Description and Use of Register Transfer Modules on Gordon Bell's site at Microsoft.
 pdp12.lofty.com shows a recently restored PDP-12
 http://www.soemtron.org/pdp7.html information about the PDP-7 and PDP7A including some manuals and a customer list covering 99 of the 120 systems shipped.
 

Various sites list documents by Charles Lasner, the creator of the alt.sys.pdp8 discussion group, and related documents by various members of the alt.sys.pdp8 readership with even more authoritative information about the various models, especially detailed focus upon the various members of the PDP-8 "family" of computers both made and not made by DEC.

Minicomputers
DEC hardware